Took may refer to:

 Took (surname)
 Took, the seventh episode of the fifth season of the HBO original series, The Wire.